Symmoca profanella is a moth in the family Autostichidae. It was described by Zerny in 1936. It is found in Morocco.

References

Moths described in 1936
Symmoca